Christopher Steven Green OBE founded and is President of the White Ribbon Campaign (UK) He was previously a full-time lecturer at Manchester Metropolitan University

In 2007 Green was awarded "Ultimate Man of the Year" by Cosmopolitan for his work with White Ribbon Campaign. He has addressed the Parliamentary Assembly of the Council of Europe, the Inter Parliamentary Union, the Oxford, Cambridge, and Durham Unions and many conferences on the theme of Engaging Men in Tackling Violence against Women.In 2012 he was appointed a UN Leader of Men by UN Secretary General Ban Ki Moon. He is author of the series of 12 leaflets, "What the White Ribbon Campaign says". He plays football twice a week and sings in a community choir.

He was a member of the Council of Europe Task Force to end violence against women, the Violence Prevention Alliance of the World Health Organization, and the steering group of the Men's Coalition.

He lives in Hebden Bridge, West Yorkshire where he sings with Calder Valley Voices, and the three Tonys as well as playing football for the Old Gits.

Green was appointed Officer of the Order of the British Empire (OBE) in the 2017 New Year Honours for services to equality.

References

External links
 White Ribbon Campaign (UK)

Academics of Manchester Metropolitan University
British activists
Living people
People from Hebden Bridge
Officers of the Order of the British Empire
Year of birth missing (living people)